Jean-Philippe Le Guellec (born 31 July 1985) is a former Canadian biathlete.

Le Guellec began competing in the biathlon in 1999, and joined the national team in 2003. He had significant success at the Junior World Championships, winning two medals in youth races at Haute Maurienne in 2004, and a bronze medal as a junior two years later in Presque Isle.

His best career season on the Biathlon World Cup circuit came in 2008/09, when he finished 32nd in the overall standings. This included his first two top 10 WC finishes, an 8th in the Hochfilzen pursuit and a 7th in the Antholz-Anterselva pursuit. His top finish in the Biathlon World Championships also came in Antholz-Anterselva, a 40th place in the 2007 individual race.

Le Guellec competed in two events at the 2006 Olympics in Turin. His best showing came in the 20 kilometre individual, where he finished 48th.

Le Guellec qualified for the 2010 Winter Olympics in Vancouver. On February 14, 2010, he finished sixth in the men's sprint, which was the highest he had ever placed in any event up to that point.

He won his first World Cup race on 1 December 2012 in Östersund, Sweden, where he won the sprint in the first World Cup for the season.

Le Guellec retired from the sport at the end of the 2013–14 season.

References

External links
IBU biography
Official Site

1985 births
Living people
Canadian people of Breton descent
Sportspeople from Kingston, Ontario
Canadian male biathletes
Biathletes at the 2006 Winter Olympics
Biathletes at the 2010 Winter Olympics
Biathletes at the 2014 Winter Olympics
Olympic biathletes of Canada
Université Laval alumni